Shmuel Ashkenasi (born January 11, 1941) is an Israeli violinist and teacher.

Biography
Born in Tel Aviv on January 11, 1941, he began his musical training at the Musical Academy of Tel-Aviv studying with legendary pedagogue Ilona Feher, the teacher of such violinists as Pinchas Zukerman and Shlomo Mintz. He arrived in the United States while still young and studied with Efrem Zimbalist at the Curtis Institute of Music in Philadelphia, Pennsylvania.

Career
Ashkenasi won the Young Concert Artists International Auditions in 1961 and in 1962 captured top prizes at the Tchaikovsky Competition in Moscow, Russia, the Merriweather Post Competition in Washington, D.C., and the Queen Elisabeth Music Competition in Belgium. As a soloist, he has toured the Soviet Union twice and plays concerts every year throughout Europe, Israel and the Far East. He has performed with American orchestras such as the Philadelphia Orchestra, Boston Symphony, Chicago Symphony, National Symphony, Los Angeles Philharmonic, Atlanta Symphony, Vienna Symphony, Royal Philharmonic, and the orchestras of Berlin, Hamburg, Munich, Zurich, Rotterdam, Geneva and Stockholm.

Among his solo recordings are the Paganini Violin Concertos No. 1 and No. 2 with the Vienna Symphony on the Deutsche Grammophon label, the two Beethoven Romances, and the Mozart A Major Concerto.

Vermeer Quartet
In 1969, Ashkenasi was chosen to form the Vermeer Quartet by NIU Chair of the Dept. of Music at Northern Illinois University, Stan Ballinger. Consequently auditions were held during the next year to establish the esteemed Vermeer Quartet. Mr. Ashkenasi remained as its first violinist throughout the quartet's career. The Vermeer Quartet held residencies at Northern Illinois University and at the Royal Northern College of Music in Manchester, England. Its discography includes works of Beethoven, Bartók, Brahms, Dvořák, Haydn (a Grammy-nominated recording of the Seven Last Words of Christ, produced by the violist of the quartet, Richard Young), Schubert, Schnittke, Tchaikovsky, and Verdi.

Pedagogue
Ashkenasi is also a noted pedagogue, currently holding the posts of Professor of Violin at Bard College Conservatory of Music, Roosevelt University's Chicago College of Performing Arts and the Curtis Institute of Music.  His students include Viviane Hagner, Gwendolyn Masin, Josep Colomé and Gerhard Schulz.

References

 Boris Schwarz: Great Masters of the Violin. From Corelli and Vivaldi to Stern, Zukerman and Perlman. Simon and Schuster, New York 1983.
 Darryl Lyman: Great Jews in Music. J. D. Publishers, Middle Village, NY 1986.
 Kurtz Myers: Index to record reviews 1984-1987. G.K. Hall, Boston, Ma. 1989.

External links
http://ccpa.roosevelt.edu/faculty-detail.php?faculty_id=28
Interview with Shmuel Ashkenasi and Richard Young, June 21, 1989

1941 births
Living people
Jewish Israeli musicians
Israeli violinists
Male classical violinists
Jewish classical violinists
Curtis Institute of Music alumni
21st-century classical violinists
21st-century Israeli male musicians
Academic staff of the Lübeck Academy of Music